Tricresyl phosphate (TCP), is a mixture of three isomeric organophosphate compounds most notably used as a flame retardant. Other uses include as a plasticizer in manufacturing for lacquers and varnishes and vinyl plastics and as an antiwear additive in lubricants. Pure tricresyl phosphate is a colourless, viscous liquid, although commercial samples are typically yellow. It is virtually insoluble in water, but easily soluble in organic solvents like toluene, hexane, and diethylether among others. It was synthesized by Alexander Williamson in 1854 upon reacting phosphorus pentachloride with cresol (a mixture of para-, ortho-, and meta- isomers of methylphenol), though today's manufacturers can prepare TCP by mixing cresol with phosphorus oxychloride or phosphoric acid as well.  TCP, especially the all-ortho isomer, is the causative agent in a number of acute poisonings.  Its chronic toxicity is also of concern.  The ortho-isomer is rarely used on its own outside of laboratory studies that require isomeric purity, due to its extremely toxic nature, and is generally excluded from commercial products where TCP is involved.

Isomers 
The most dangerous isomers are considered to be those containing ortho isomers, such as tri-ortho-cresyl phosphate, TOCP. The World Health Organization stated in 1990 that "Because of considerable variation among individuals in sensitivity to TOCP, it is not possible to establish a safe level of exposure" and "TOCP are therefore considered major hazards to human health." Therefore, strenuous efforts have been made to reduce the content of the ortho isomers in commercial TCP if there is a risk of human exposure.  However, researchers at the University of Washington found that non-ortho TCP isomers present in synthetic jet engine oils do inhibit certain enzymes.

Health calamities from TCP
TCP was the source of a 1977 epidemic of acute polyneuropathy in Sri Lanka where 20 Tamil girls were poisoned by TCP-contaminated gingili oil. It is a toxic substance that causes neuropathy, paralysis in the hands and feet, and/or death for humans and animals alike. It can be ingested, inhaled, or even absorbed through the skin. Its ortho-isomer is notoriously known as a source of several delayed neurotoxic outbreaks across recent history. Contemporary commercial products typically only contain the para- and meta- isomers of TCP due to the lack of neurotoxic potential within these isomers.

The earliest known mass poisoning event by TOCP started as early as 1899 when six French hospital patients were given a phosphocresote cough mixture containing the organophosphate compound. Pharmacist Jules Brissonet had synthesized this compound in the hopes of treating pulmonary phthisis (tuberculosis), but soon after administration all 6 patients developed polyneuropathy. The original paper ads described this phosphocresote to be:A bland, limpid liquid, nearly tasteless and odourless, which is not irritating to the gastric mucous membranes. When creosote is combined with phosphoric acid the metabolic action produced is much more marked, and Phosote can be tolerated in larger doses and for a longer continuance than Creosote or Guaiacol. Dose of the preparation, one to two grammes three times a day.

The greatest mass poisoning by TOCP occurred in 1930 when it was added as an adulterant into the popular drink "Ginger Jake" (or Jamaica "Jake") during the United States Prohibition era. Although the drink was a primary substitute for alcohol during that period, when all alcoholic drinks had been outlawed, under the Eighteenth Amendment to the United States Constitution, it was also listed as a cure for "assorted ailments" in the U.S. Pharmocopoeia and thus easy to acquire. Up to 100,000 people were poisoned and 5,000 paralyzed when a manufacturer of Ginger Jake added Lindol—a compound that consisted mainly of TOCP— to their product. The exact reason for why TOCP was found in Ginger Jake is disputed; some sources claim it was to further extract the Jamaica root, others to water the drink down, and another as a result of contamination from lubricating oils. Binges of Ginger Jake resulted in what was known to be a "Jake walk," in which patients experienced a highly irregular gait caused by numbness in the legs that followed with eventual paralysis of the wrists and feet. In medical journals it was described to have produced an organophosphate-induced delayed neuropathy (OPIDN) neurodegenerative syndrome, "characterized by distal axonal lesions, ataxia, and neuronal degeneration in the spinal cord and peripheral nervous systems."

In 1932, 60 European women experienced TOCP poisoning by means of the abortion-inducing (abortifacient) drug Apiol. This drug, formed by the phenylpropanoid compound extracted from parsley leaves, was exploited throughout history—and even known to Hippocrates himself—as an agent to terminate pregnancies. The contamination of the modern drug in 1932 was not accidental, but rather included as an "additional stimulus." Those who took the pill experienced comas, convulsions, paralysis of the lower body (paraplegia) and often death  Apiol was subsequently criticized by doctors, journalists, and activists alike until its discontinuation, citing that the dangers were too great and the number of poisonings were likely higher than accounted for.

Other mass poisonings include:
 In 1937, 60 South Africans were poisoned after using contaminated cooking oil that had been stored in drums that previously stored lubricating oil.
 In two separate incidents in 1940, 74, and at least 17, men in units of the Swiss army experienced a similar outbreak when their cooking oil was contaminated with machine gun oil. They became known as the "Oil soldiers".
 In the 1950s, 11 South Africans used water from drums from a paint factory that previously stored TOCP.
 10,000 people in Morocco were poisoned in 1959, when they consumed cooking oil contaminated with jet-plane lubricating oil.
 Hundreds of Germans in the cities of Eckernförde (1941) and Kiel (1945) when torpedo-lubricants were used as a cooking oil replacement, "organised" from the "black market". That was common, for example after World War I, because cooking oil was of natural origin but, in World War II, TOCP was added for thermic purposes. Severe physical and neurological damage was experienced, and the illness was called "Eckernförder Krankheit" (Eckernfoerde Disease).

Aerotoxic syndrome
TCP is used as an additive in turbine engine oil and can potentially contaminate an airliner cabin via a bleed air "fume event".  Aerotoxic syndrome is the name given to the alleged ill effects (with symptoms including memory loss, depression and schizophrenia) caused by exposure to engine chemicals. However, industry-funded studies in the UK have not found a link between TCP and long-term health problems.

Safety

Animals 
In studies on slow lorises (Nyticebus coucang coucang), numerous chronic effects observed from topical applications. Mammalian placental development were also negatively affected.

Metabolism 
Although TOCP is mainly excreted through urine and feces, it is partially metabolized by the hepatic cytochrome P450 system.  Pathways include hydroxylation at one or more methyl groups, dearylation (removal of a o-cresyl group) and conversion of the hydroxymethyl groups to an aldehyde or a carboxylic acid.

The first step results in a saligenin cyclic o-tolyl phosphate (SCOTP) intermediate, a neurotoxin. To the right, the first step of TOCP metabolism is depicted by means of chemical structures. This intermediate is able to inhibit neuropathy target esterase (NTE) and results in the classic organophosphate-induced delayed neuropathy (OPIDN). In tandem, TOCP exerts physical damage by causing axonal destruction and myelin disintegration within specialized cells that transmit nerve impulses (neurons).

In addition to the formation of SCOTP, the interactions between TOCP and two different human cytochrome P450 complexes (1A2 and 3A4) can further produce 2-(ortho-cresyl)-4H-1,2,3-benzodioxaphosphoran-2-one (CBDP). This metabolite can bind to butyrylcholinesterase (BuChE) and/or acetylcholinesterase (AChE).

Binding to BuChE results in no adverse effects, for its typical role is to covalently bind to organophosphate poisons and detoxify them by inactivation. The dangers in metabolizing TOCP to CBDP occur when its potential to bind to AChE become imminent, for inactivation of the enzyme in nerve synapses can be lethal. The enzyme plays a tantamount role in terminating nerve impulse transmission "by hydrolyzing the neurotransmitter acetylcholine." Upon inactivation, acetylcholine can no longer be broken down in the body and results in uncontrollable muscle spasms, paralyzed breathing (bradycardia), convulsions, and/or death. Luckily, TOCP is considered a weak AChE inhibitor.

Onset and treatment 
In humans, the first symptoms are weakness/paralysis of the hands and feet on both sides of the body due to damage to the peripheral nervous system (polyneuropathy) and a sensation of pins-and-needles (paraesthesia). Onset typically occurs between 3–28 days from initial exposure. If ingested, this can be preceded by gastrointestinal symptoms that include nausea, vomiting, and diarrhea. Rates of metabolism vary by species and by individual; some people developed severe polyneuropathy after ingesting 0.15g of TOCP, whereas others have been reported asymptomatic after 1-2g. Though death is uncommon in acute exposure cases, the result of paralysis can last for months or years due to differences in gender, age, and route of exposure. The cardinal treatment is physical therapy to restore the use of the hands and feet, though it can take up to 4 years to only regain a fraction of motor control.

Exposure to TOCP has been characterized by a list of observations:

 Cholinesterase levels will remain unchanged or show no significant changes.
 Electromyography will show partial or complete reactions of degeneration.
 An increase of protein in cerebrospinal fluid.
 Swelling of the parotid glands (non-tender).

References

Organophosphates
Solvents
Plasticizers
Fuel additives
Prohibition in the United States
Neurotoxins
Acetylcholinesterase inhibitors
Phosphate esters
Flame retardants